Son de Fierro is an Argentinian television comedy, produced by Pol-Ka in 2007 and 2008. It was broadcast on Canal 13, becoming the most popular television series in Argentina in 2007 and 2008. The first episode was broadcast on January 8, 2007, and the last episode on February 6, 2008.

Main roles in Son de Fierro were portrayed by Osvaldo Laport, María Valenzuela, Mariano Martínez, Soledad Fandiño, Vanesa Gonzáles, Eleonora Wexler and Camila Bordonaba. Son de Fierro had 251 episodes. Son de Fierro follows the life of the Fierro family, of their members and their friends. The character played by Laport was called "Martín Fierro", but neither the program or the character were an adaptation or a free reference to the famed poem Martín Fierro by José Hernández.

During this show, Felipe Colombo, Camila Bordonaba and Vanesa Gonzáles formed the band, but it didn't "survive" the show. Bordonaba and Colombo had musical contract with Cris Morena (the band Erreway).

This comedy was nominated for the Martín Fierro Awards for the best comedy.

Cast

The Fierro family
 Osvaldo Laport as Martín Fierro
 María Valenzuela as Lucía Fierro
 Mariano Martínez as Juan Martín Fierro
 Soledad Fandiño as Sandra Fierro
 Felipe Colombo as Lucho Fierro
 Fabio Posca as Ezequiel
 Freddy Villarreal as Ángel Fierro
 Dora Baret as Mimicha
 Juan Carlos Dual as Don Martín
 Isabel Macedo as Sissi

Others
 Camila Bordonaba as Karina Andurregui
 Eleonora Wexler as Rita
 Mario Pasik as José María Fontana
 Vanesa Gonzáles as Morena Fontana
 Facundo Espinosa as Amadeo Andurregui
 José Luis Mazza as Remo Ortelli
 Manuela Pal as Luli

Awards and nominations
 Son de Fierro was nominated for Clarín Award for the best drama script.
 Martín Fierro Award nomination for the best comedy in 2008.

References

External links
 Website of Son de fierro 
 Ficha técnica del programa en Pol-Ka 
 

2007 telenovelas
2008 telenovelas
2007 Argentine television series debuts
2008 Argentine television series endings
Argentine telenovelas
Pol-ka telenovelas
Argentine comedy television series
2000s Argentine television series
Spanish-language telenovelas